Zaki Anwar Nusseibeh is the Cultural Adviser to the President of the UAE and the Chancellor of UAE University. He has been active in government service in the United Arab Emirates since its formation in 1971, and with the Government of the Emirate of Abu Dhabi since 1968.

Before his current role, Nusseibeh served as Minister of State in the Ministry of Foreign Affairs (2017-2021), where he contributed to the establishment and management of the Office of Public and Cultural Diplomacy, as a coordinating body committed to international cooperation through cross-cultural dialogue and exchange through the promotion of UAE arts and culture abroad. He previously served as Assistant Minister in the Ministry of Foreign Affairs, and Cultural Advisor at the UAE Presidential Court, later Ministry of Presidential Affairs.

From the late 1960s, he acted as the personal interpreter and adviser to the founder of the UAE, Sheikh Zayed bin Sultan Al Nahyan. He then acted in the same role with his successor UAE President Sheikh Khalifa bin Zayed Al Nahyan.

Early life and career 

Born in Jerusalem, Zaki Nusseibeh was educated at St. George's School, Jerusalem, and completed his secondary education at Rugby School, Warwickshire, UK. He then attended Queen's College, University of Cambridge, graduating with an MA (with honors) degree in economics in 1967.

Many of Nusseibeh's family were displaced during the conflict that led to the establishment of the state of Israel in 1948. His mother, Nuzha Al Ghoussein, left with her family from Ramleh in 1948 and her brother, Talat Al Ghoussein, subsequently became Kuwait's Ambassador to Washington in 1970. Nusseibeh's father, Anwar Nusseibeh who had lost a leg during the 1948 war, became active in Jordanian politics, and held several cabinet posts in the Jordanian government, including Defense, Interior and Education in the 1950s, and stood for Parliament as well as serving in the Senate.

As a young student in England, Nusseibeh was involved in Palestinian politics, forming an Arab Society at the University of Cambridge which held debates and invited speakers on topical issues in contemporary Arab politics.

Nusseibeh graduated from Cambridge at the time of the June 1967 Arab-Israeli war, and a return to Jerusalem was not a feasible option. He instead settled in Abu Dhabi, where he worked as a freelance journalist for a number of British and Arab publications including The Economist, The Financial Times and the BBC Arabic Service. He was soon asked to join the Abu Dhabi government, working briefly with the newly established Civil Service Authority (1968-1969), then moving to Abu Dhabi's Department of Information as Director of Research and Documentation. There he helped in establishing Abu Dhabi's first newspapers in Arabic and English (Al-Ittihad 1969, Abu Dhabi Times 1969). He then became Director of Information in the newly formed UAE Federal Ministry of Information (1972-1975).

While at the Ministry of Information, he also worked as an English language broadcaster and program producer, and helped plan and develop an information and media strategy for the government. He was also involved in the preparing, editing and translating of all its books and publications.

In 1975, Zaki Nusseibeh became the Director of the Press Office in the Diwan (Court) of Sheikh Zayed, subsequently becoming an Adviser while continuing his role as the President's personal interpreter.

Art and culture in diplomacy 

Zaki Nusseibeh has served on several public and private bodies dealing with the development of cultural and educational strategies in the UAE. He was Deputy Chairman of the Abu Dhabi Authority for Culture and Heritage (2006-2012) and a member of the Board of the Abu Dhabi Authority for Tourism and Culture (2012-2016), today the Abu Dhabi Department of Culture and Tourism. In this capacity, he contributed to the development of some of Abu Dhabi's major cultural and art initiatives, such as the Saadiyat Culture District and its leading museums.

Nusseibeh's publications include translations of Gulf and Arab poetry into several European languages as well as articles in different journals and newspapers.

He has recently published a book in Arabic about a tribal leader who was a close companion to Sheikh Zayed, the founder of the United Arab Emirates (Sheikh Zayed Wa Salem Bin Hamm, Rifqat Oumor, Abu Dhabi 2019).

Affiliations and chairmanships 

Zaki Nusseibeh has served on several public and private bodies dealing with the development of cultural and educational strategies in the UAE.

Nusseibeg was appointed as the chairman of the Board of Trustees of the Sorbonne University Abu Dhabi in 2018, having helped to establish the university in 2006.

He is a member of the Administrative Board of the Emirates Diplomatic Academy with oversight responsibility for its management (2017–present). He is also a member on several other Boards including the Sheikh Zayed Book Award (2005–present), the International Prize for ArabicFiction (2009–present) and Abu Dhabi University (2003–present).

He was elected to the American Academy of Arts and Sciences in Washington (2020).

Nusseibeh was the chairman of the advisory board for the Middle East Centre of the London School of Economics (2015-2018), as well as the President of the Alliance Française in Paris (2013-2017).

He was also the President of the Alliance Française Abu Dhabi (1977-2017) and of the UAE Chapter of the International Friends of Richard Wagner Society (2008–present) and a member of the Board of Trustees of the Agha Khan Museum in Toronto (2016-2019).

He is also the Chancellor of the United Arab Emirates University (UAEU).

Awards
His Excellency has been conferred many national orders of merit in recognition of his distinguished service;
 The UAE Order of the Union medal (2021)
 Officer of the French Legion of Honour (2015)
 Commander of the Order of the British Empire (2013)
 Commander's Cross of the German Order of Merit (2013)
 Medal for Merit to Culture - ‘Gloria Artis’, Republic of Poland (2010) 
 Commander of the Order of Arts and Letters, France (2008)
 Commander of the Order of Academic Palms, France (2007)
 Grand Officer of the Star of Italian Solidarity (2007)
 Grand Decoration of Honour in Gold for Services to the Republic of Austria (2007)
 Chevalier of the French Legion of Honour (May 2001)
 Officer's Cross of the Order of Civil Merit, Spain (1999)
 Commander of the Royal Victorian Order, United Kingdom (1989)
 Commander of the Order of Merit of the Italian Republic (1983)
 Officer of the National Order of Merit, France (1980)
 Officer of the Order of Independence, Jordan (1969)

His Excellency has received notable awards for his work for the arts and cultural diplomacy:

 Exceptional Excellence Award, Beirut Institute (2019)
 The personality of the Year, Emirates Literary Festival (2018)
 Cultural Diplomat of the Year, Abu Dhabi Culture Summit (2017)
 Kennedy Center Gold Medal in the Arts, John F. Kennedy Center for the Performing Arts (2014)
 Europe-Arab Prize for Culture, The European Foundation for Culture, Leipzig (2013)
 Cultural Personality of the Year, The Sultan Bin Ali Al Owais Foundation (2013)
 Ring of Tolerance, The European Academy of Science and Arts, Frankfurt (2012)
 The Abu Dhabi Award (2007)

Personal life 
Zaki Nusseibeh's daughter is Lana Nusseibeh, a diplomat who serves as the United Arab Emirates Permanent Representative to the United Nations since September 2013.

References

External links 
 

Living people
Zaki
Palestinian journalists
Palestinian emigrants to the United Arab Emirates
People from Abu Dhabi
Naturalized citizens of the United Arab Emirates
People from Jerusalem
Recipients of the Grand Decoration for Services to the Republic of Austria
Commanders Crosses of the Order of Merit of the Federal Republic of Germany
1946 births
Alumni of Queens' College, Cambridge